Anthony Mabron Burton (March 23, 1937 – February 25, 2016) was an American actor and boxer. He was known for his role as Tony "Duke" Evers in the Rocky films.

Early life
Burton was born in Flint, Michigan. He had a younger sister named Loretta. A Flint Northern High School graduate, he was a Michigan Golden Gloves heavyweight boxing champion and two-time all-state football player. At Northern, he played halfback. In 1954, he scored 13 touchdowns and led his team in scoring. Many of his scoring runs were of 50 yards or more. He gained 820 yards rushing that year, and one of his runs was for 95 yards. That same year, he was selected to the first teams of the All City and All Valley teams as a halfback. He was also chosen as an All State honorable mention. He was the team's co-captain and Most Valuable Player. Burton led his team in yards gained and receiving yards. In one game against Grand Rapids Catholic, he gained 213 total yards. At Northern, Burton was also the leading baseball pitcher, pitching the team to the city championship title.

Career

Boxing
Burton's boxing career included the Flint Golden Gloves light heavyweight championship in 1955 and 1957. Burton won the State Golden Gloves Light Heavyweight Championship in 1957 and lost in the Chicago Tournament of Champions semi-finals. He fought as a professional boxer in 1958 and 1959. During that time he was knocked out by knockout artist, Lamar Clark, who holds the record for most consecutive knockouts at 44.

Prison
After his brief professional boxing career, Burton served more than three years in a Chino, Calif., prison for robbery.  The acting exercises he performed as part of a therapy program helped steer him into an acting career after his release. NEA's Frank Sanello in March 1988:

More specifically, one of the skills acquired at Chino landed Burton his wife, Rae, whom he met on a TV repair house call. Moreover, a workshop in the prison, that used psychodrama as a form of therapy, pointed Burton towards his acting career, when an emotional breakthrough achieved by one of his partners in an acting exercise dramatically demonstrated theater's potential power.

Acting
After prison, Burton started getting work with small theater companies in and around Los Angeles, garnering favorable notices early on.

A life member of the Actors Studio, Burton numbers among his many credits a co-starring role in Frank's Place and parts in films, such as Stir Crazy and The Toy. He also appeared as Wells, one of the prisoners trapped in the besieged police station in John Carpenter's 1976 Howard Hawks-inspired action film, Assault on Precinct 13. He later starred in the Rocky films as a trainer to Apollo Creed (Carl Weathers) and Rocky Balboa (Sylvester Stallone). He appeared in an episode of Gibbsville in 1976. Burton also appeared in The Shining, House Party 2, and Hook. He had guest appearances in Kojak, The Rockford Files, CHiPs, Twin Peaks, and The A-Team. Burton also guest starred as Conrad King Baylor on In the Heat of the Night in the episode "King's Ransom", which aired in January 1990.

Personal life
Burton resided in California for 30 years. He attended Immanuel Baptist Church in Highland, California. He was married to Aurelain (Rae) from 1980 until his death. The couple had two sons, one of whom, Martin, died of a heart attack at the age of 43 on May 8, 2014. They also had two daughters, Juanita and Christal.

Burton was a talented chess player. He defeated Stanley Kubrick on the set of The Shining, in which Burton played Larry Durkin, the garage owner. Speaking with Kubrick biographer Vincent LoBrutto, Burton recalled his first day on the set:

Recognition
In 1993, Burton was inducted into the Greater Flint Afro-American Hall of Fame.

Death
Burton had been frequently hospitalized for the last year of his life, according to his sister. On February 25, 2016, he died at the age of 78, from complications of pneumonia at a hospital in Menifee, California.

Filmography

Film

Television

Video

Professional boxing record

|-align=center
| 8
|
|4–3–1
|align=left|
|KO
|4 
|
|April 4, 1959
|align=left| Polo Grounds, Palm Springs, California
|
|-align=center
| 7
|
|4–2–1
|align=left|
|KO
|4 
|
|February 21, 1959
|align=left| Legion Stadium, Hollywood, California
| 
|-align=center
| 6
|
|4–1–1
|align=left|
|KO
|2 
|
|June 14, 1958
|align=left| Legion Stadium, Hollywood
| 
|-align=center
| 5
|
|3–1–1
|align=left|
|Decision
|4
|
|April 7, 1958
|align=left| Bakersfield Dome, Bakersfield, California
| 
|-align=center
| 4
|
|2–1–1
|align=left|
|KO
|4
|
|February 8, 1958
|align=left| Legion Stadium, Hollywood
| 
|-align=center
| 3
|
|2–0–1
|align=left|
|Decision
|4
|
|January 30, 1958
|align=left| Grand Olympic Auditorium, Los Angeles, California
| 
|-align=center
| 2
|
|1–0–1
|align=left|
|Decision
|4
|
|January 28, 1958
|align=left| Arena, San Bernardino, California
|
|-align=center
| 1
|
|1–0
|align=left|
|KO
|4 
| 
|January 4, 1958
|align=left| Legion Stadium, Hollywood
| 
|}

References

External links
 
 
 Tony Burton 1993 Greater Flint Afro-American Hall of Fame Inductee
 Tony Burton(Aveleyman)

1937 births
2016 deaths
Male actors from Michigan
American male film actors
Sportspeople from Flint, Michigan
Boxers from Michigan
African-American male actors
American male television actors
American male boxers
20th-century American male actors
21st-century American male actors
Deaths from pneumonia in California
People from Menifee, California
20th-century African-American people
21st-century African-American people